E129 may refer to:
Allura Red AC, food coloring designated by E number "E129"
E129 series, series of trains used in Japan